Vasili Ivanovich Komaroff (1871 – 1923) was a Russian serial killer, convicted for the killing of 29 people in Moscow between 1921 and 1923. One of the earliest known serial killers in the Soviet Union, Komaroff was a horse trader who murdered at least 33 customers in the stable next to his home, and was executed on June 18, 1923.

Background
Komaroff was born Vasili Terentevich Petrov (Russian: Василий Терентьевич Петров) in 1871, to a large poor family in Vitebsk Governorate, Russian Empire. Many members of Komaroff's family suffered from alcoholism, and he began drinking at age 15. Komaroff had been conscripted into the Russian army for 4 years, and at age 28 he married. In 1904, during the Russian-Japanese War, Komaroff traveled to the Far East where he managed to earn a small fortune, but he soon wasted the money. Komaroff received a one-year prison sentence for robbing a military warehouse, and while serving his sentence his wife died from cholera. After his release he settled in Riga (now in Latvia) where he married a Polish widow named Sophia, with whom he had two children. Komaroff, still an alcoholic, often beat his wife and children.

In 1915, during World War I when troops of the German Empire entered the Baltic, Komaroff and his family moved to the Volga region in Russia. When the Russian Empire began to collapse in 1917, Komaroff joined the Red Army during October Revolution, learning to read and write and rising to the position of platoon commander. While fighting in the Russian Civil War, he was captured by the White Army troops of General Denikin. Komaroff managed to escape, but to avoid the judgement of the Military Revolutionary Tribunal he changed his name to Vasili Ivanovich Komaroff (alternately spelled Komarov), and in 1920 moved to Moscow with his family. Komaroff settled in 26 Shabolovka Street, where he began working as a carriage driver and horse trader, as well as continuing his thievery.

Murders
In February 1921, when Vladimir Lenin declared the New Economic Policy which allowed private enterprise, Komaroff began to commit his first murders. All killings followed a single formula: Komaroff became acquainted with a client who wanted to buy a horse, where he brought them to his home and served them vodka. The victim would be killed with a hammer or sometimes have their throat slit, afterwards the corpse was placed into a bag then either hid around the house, buried underground or dumped in the Moscow River. The following year Komarov's wife Sophia found out about the murders, but reacted to it calmly, and began participating in the killings herself. In 1921 he committed at least 17 murders, in the next two years - still at least 12 murders, although he later confessed to 33 murders.

Police began to notice a series of murders had started occurring around Moscow when the bodies of 21 men were discovered after being disposed in sacks of garbage every Thursday or Saturday, leading the police to a two-year investigation. Komaroff was known as a happily married man, but those close to the family knew that he was extremely abusive, and had once tried to kill his eight-year-old son. Spectators in the market where he went to sell his horses began to notice that he came every Wednesday and Friday, many times without bringing a horse, and almost always left with a customer.

Arrest and conviction
In early 1923, police showed up at Komaroff's home originally about illegal alcohol, but during the search of their stable they discovered his latest victim under a stack of hay. Komaroff managed to evade the police by jumping out of a window, but on March 18, 1923, he was arrested in Moscow Oblast. While undergoing police interrogation, he admitted to having killed 33 men, as far as he could remember, who were looking to buy one of his horses. Robbery was noted as motive for the murders, although the collective amount he earned from all of his killings was very low. After confessing to his crimes, Komaroff led the police to the places where he had disposed of the bodies. However, only 6 of the remaining 12 were found. When he was interviewed about his crimes, he described murder as "an awfully easy job." While he was in prison, he attempted to commit suicide three times. His wife Sophia was also found guilty of murder, since the police concluded that it would be impossible for her to not have known what her husband was doing inside the stable next to their home.

Komaroff and Sophia were both sentenced to the sentenced, and were executed by firing squad in Moscow on June 18, 1923.

See also
 List of serial killers by number of victims

1871 births
1923 deaths
Executed Soviet serial killers
Male serial killers
People convicted of murder by the Soviet Union
People executed by the Soviet Union by firing squad
Soviet people convicted of murder
Violence against men in Europe